"The Hype" is a song written and recorded by American musical duo Twenty One Pilots from their fifth studio album Trench (2018). The song was released as the sixth and final single from Trench on July 16, 2019, by Fueled by Ramen and Elektra Music Group. The track was written by lead singer Tyler Joseph, with production being handled by himself and Paul Meany. The song's lyrics discuss perseverance and loyalty. "The Hype" reached a peak of number 3 on the US Billboard Hot Rock Songs chart.

Composition 
As with most of its parent album Trench, "The Hype" was written by Tyler Joseph, the lead singer of Twenty One Pilots, and produced by him alongside Paul Meany of the alternative rock band Mutemath. The songwriting process and recording took place in secret in Joseph's basement studio in Columbus, Ohio, while the track was mixed by Adam Hawkins and mastered by Chris Gehringer at Sterling Sound, New York City. In an interview with Coup de Main Magazine, Joseph revealed that while writing the track, he intended for its production to sound like that of which he found in his childhood. In an AMA on Reddit, he disclosed that the track was among the hardest to write on Trench.

"The Hype" has been described as a 90s-style rock, indie rock and alternative rock "chant-along" featuring a ukulele bridge. Lyrically, it explores themes of perseverance, loyalty and the weight of fame. Joseph explained that its lyrics address his younger self, discussing "the difference between internal pressure and external pressure," and described the track as "just an encouragement to keep going, to let things roll off your back that deserve to be put aside." He further added in an interview with Kerrang! that it reflects on the fragility of a song and how "a single comment can completely change it." A clip from the first episode of their web series documenting their tour in support of their second album Regional at Best is sampled during the bridge, with the audio snippet relating to their reliance on technology during live shows, following the departure of the band's 
two original members, Chris Salih and Nick Thomas.

Music video 
On July 26, 2019, Twenty One Pilots published an official music video for "The Hype" on YouTube. The video starts off with Tyler Joseph standing in the middle of a road. He opens a flap on his shirt and reveals a screen behind it. The camera zooms in on the screen, and the screen appears to be playing a video. There is a house on the screen, the video then zooms in on the window of the house, and the duo is performing the song inside. There are a few people watching and listening, as if there was a concert inside the house. After singing the chorus for the second time, Joseph climbs a ladder, opens a door in the ceiling, and gets out of the house. Then continues singing, but now he's on the roof. The video zooms out, showing that there is a much larger audience outside and they're watching Tyler Joseph and Josh Dun perform on the roof. Parts of the roof start exploding, creating holes, and Joseph falls through the roof. He then sings the final lyrics to the song inside the house. While Josh is playing the final instrumental part, the pieces of all the broken objects in the room start flying around and merging with the other pieces, which repairs all of the broken objects. Joseph walks over to a painting and uses yellow tape to secure it to the wall. The video ends with Joseph closing the flap on his shirt and Dun giving him a cup filled with a strawberry drink.

The video has garnered over 50 million views on YouTube as of June 7, 2021.

Critical reception 
"The Hype" was positively received by music critics. Gary Ryan of NME opined that "The Hype" was one of the songs off Trench "strong enough to exist outside of any story," referring to the narrative found on the record. Billboard writer Chris Payne described the song as a "jubilant, crowd-ready panorama." In his review of Trench for AllMusic, Neil Z. Yeung lauded it as one of the record's "second-half highlights." Stephen Keegan, writing for Hot Press, considered that the track displayed "the pop sensibilities that have earned the band their audience," additionally predicting that the track "is sure to become an alternative anthem."

Track listing

Credits and personnel
Credits adapted from the liner notes of Trench and Tidal.

Recording and management
Published by Warner-Tamerlane publishing Corp. (BMI) and Stryker Joseph Music (BMI)
Recorded at Tyler Joseph's home studio (Columbus, Ohio) and United Recording Studios (Hollywood, California)
Mastered at Sterling Sound (New York, New York)

Twenty One Pilots
 Tyler Joseph – vocals, bass, synthesizers, ukulele, organs, guitar, programming, songwriting, production
 Josh Dun – drums, percussion, backing vocals
Additional personnel
 Paul Meany – synthesizers, programming, production
 Adam Hawkins – mixing
 Chris Gehringer – mastering

Charts

Weekly charts

Year-end charts

Certifications

Release history

References 

2018 songs
2019 singles
Twenty One Pilots songs
American alternative rock songs
American rock songs
American indie rock songs
Songs written by Tyler Joseph